Kyaw Zin Lwin (born 4 January 1993) is a Burmese professional footballer who plays as a defender for Myanmar club Ayeyawady United.

Early life
Kyaw Zin Lwin was born on 4 January 1993 in Pyuntaza, Nyaunglebin Township, Bago District, Bago Region, Myanmar.

Magway FC
When he was in junior team in 2011, he trained under the guidance of U Chit Naing whom he described as his first teacher in football. But he had to start his career as a ball boy and there was no playmates for him at that time. The son of the cook of Magway FC helped him in training. Ye Win Aung and Zaw Min Htun, both of whom called him little brother, encouraged him a lot and guided him at that time. They became his icons as they were hardworking footballers who spent much of their free time for training. 
After being allowed to play a year in junior team, he was considered not qualified to be in senior team and sent on loan to Mawyawadi FC. He became a line up player at that team and played about 13 games . At first he was paid 50,000 kyats per month. Later when he played in senior team, he asked for 1.5 lakh per month, and then 1 lakh per month as salary but the club offered him 80,000 kyats per month. Hein Zar Aung told him to come back to Magway FC. When he came back, Magway FC offered him to play as a senior team player but he denied and chose to stay in junior team where  he played 21 games against many clubs except against Kambawza FC. After that, according to his in friendly against other teams and U Kyi Lwin's support, he signed his contract as a senior team player. He won 2016 General Aung San Shield with Magway FC on 17 August 2016. Currently, he is playing as a defender in Magway FC.

Myanmar national team

At youth level
At first he was selected for Myanmar's Under-23 squad but not as a first line-up player. During 28th Seagames in Singapore, in a match against Indonesia, he came on as a substitute in the 65th minute and scored a goal. Since then, he became a line-up player in matches against Singapore, Philippines, Cambodia, Vietnam, and Thailand. He won silver medal with Myanmar national team  in 28th Seagames. His goal in a match against Philippines was selected as one of the Top 10 goals in 28th Seagames.

Outside football

Personal life
He left school when he WAS in the 8th Standard. Before he started his football career, he worked as an assistant for masons to get 2,000 kyats per day to help his mother who was a pedlar with many young children. When he was paid 50,000 kyats per month he send 40,000 kyats to his family.

Kyaw Zin Lwin is in a relationship with Pann Nu.

Despite the similar name, he is not related to either Kyaw Zin Htet or Kyaw Zin Phyo.

Charity
He involved in charitable efforts in his hometown Pyuntasa.

International

Honors and achievements

Club
2016 General Aung San Shield

International
Silver medal 28th Seagames

References

External links
profile

1993 births
Living people
Burmese footballers
Myanmar international footballers
Magway FC players
Association football defenders
Southeast Asian Games silver medalists for Myanmar
Southeast Asian Games medalists in football
Competitors at the 2015 Southeast Asian Games
People from Bago Region